Burunqovaq (also, Burunkovag, Burunkovak, Burunkovakh, and Kalinin) is a village and municipality in the Samukh Rayon of Azerbaijan.  It has a population of 379.

References 

Populated places in Samukh District